Ezra Dale Polley (born August 9, 1964) is a former Major League Baseball pitcher for the New York Yankees. He bats right-handed and throws left-handed.

He was signed by the Atlanta Braves as an amateur free agent in 1987. Polley had a 1-3 record in 32 games, with a 7.89 ERA. Polley attended Kentucky State University.

External links
, or Retrosheet, or Pura Pelota (Venezuelan Winter League)

1965 births
Living people
Baseball players from Kentucky
Columbus Clippers players
Greenville Braves players
Kentucky State Thorobreds baseball players
Kentucky State University alumni
Major League Baseball pitchers
New York Yankees players
People from Georgetown, Kentucky
Pulaski Braves players
Richmond Braves players
Sumter Braves players
Tigres de Aragua players
American expatriate baseball players in Venezuela